William Foxe (1479/80 – 1554), of Stoke by Greet and St. John's Hospital, Ludlow, Shropshire, was an English politician.

Family
Foxe was the eldest son of Edmund Foxe of Stoke by Greet and his wife Catherine  Pickenham, the daughter and coheiress of John Pickenham of Pickenham, Norfolk. Foxe married Jane Downe, a daughter of Richard Downe of Ludlow, Shropshire. They had four daughters and six sons, including MP, Charles and Edmund Foxe. His son-in-law, William Hopton, was made overseer of Foxe's will, alongside his son Charles Foxe and his wife Jane, who died in 1566, was his only excetrix. Foxe was buried in Ludford Church.

Career
He was a Member (MP) of the Parliament of England for Ludlow in 1523, 1529 and 1536.

References

1480 births
1554 deaths
Politicians from Ludlow
English MPs 1523
English MPs 1529–1536
English MPs 1536